No. 222 Squadron was a Royal Air Force fighter unit.

History

In World War I
The squadron was formally formed at Thasos on 1 April 1918 from "A" Squadron of the former No. 2 Wing, RNAS when the Royal Air Force was formed. At this time, Richard Peirse became Officer Commanding 222 Squadron. Later, on 6 April 1918, former "Z" Squadron of No. 2 Wing, RNAS was added to the strength. Renumbered No. 62 Wing and consisting of Nos. 478, 479 and 480 Flights, the squadron was given the task of maintaining raids on Turkish targets in Macedonia and Thrace, operating from islands in the Northern Aegean, officially adopting the 222 Squadron number plate on 14 September 1918. The squadron continued to carry out raids on Turkish targets in the Balkans until the end of the war, eventually disbanding on 27 February 1919.

In World War II

On 5 October 1939 No. 222 Squadron was reformed at RAF Duxford flying Blenheim Mk.If's in the shipping protection role, but in March of the following year it re-equipped with Spitfires and became a day-fighter unit. It fought during the Battle of Britain, being based at RAF Hornchurch on 15 September 1940, under Squadron Leader "Johnnie" Hill. It later took part in Operation Jubilee, the 1942 Dieppe raid. In December 1944 the squadron converted to Tempests, which it flew until the squadron was recalled to the UK to re-equip with Meteors.

Entering the jet age
From October 1945 the squadron flew various marks of Meteors for nine years and later, after December 1954 Hunters, being part of Scotland's defence, but on 1 November 1957 No. 222 was disbanded.

On Rockets
In its last incarnation on 1 May 1960, No. 222 became a Bristol Bloodhound SAM unit at RAF Woodhall Spa, but after four years service in this role it disbanded on 30 June 1964.

References

Notes

Bibliography

 Burton, E. Go straight ahead: Battle of Britain diary of 222 Squadron RAF. London: Square One, 1996.
 Halley, James J. The Squadrons of the Royal Air Force & Commonwealth, 1981-1988. Tonbridge, Kent, UK: Air-Britain (Historians) Ltd., 1988. .
 Jefford, C.G. RAF Squadrons, a Comprehensive Record of the Movement and Equipment of all RAF Squadrons and their Antecedents since 1912. Shrewsbury, Shropshire, UK: Airlife Publishing, 2001. .
 Rawlings, John D.R. Coastal, Support and Special Squadrons of the RAF and their Aircraft. London: Jane's Publishing Company Ltd., 1982. .
 Rawlings, John D.R. Fighter Squadrons of the RAF and their Aircraft. London: Macdonald and Jane's (Publishers) Ltd., 1978. .
 Robinson, Anthony. RAF Squadrons in the Battle of Britain. London: Arms and Armour Press Ltd., 1987 (republished 1999 by Brockhampton Press, .).

External links

  Official history of No. 222 Squadron
 History of No.'s 221–225 Squadrons at RAF Web

222 Squadron
Military units and formations established in 1918
1918 establishments in the United Kingdom